Klaus Ofner (born 15 August 1968 in Murau, Steiermark)  is an Austrian nordic combined skier who competed during the late 1980s and early 1990s. He won a bronze medal in the Nordic combined 3 x 10 km team event at the 1992 Winter Olympics in Albertville.

Ofner also won two medals at the 1991 FIS Nordic World Ski Championships in Val di Fiemme with gold in the 3 x 10 km team event and bronze in the 15 km individual event.

References

External links 
 
 

1968 births
Living people
Austrian male Nordic combined skiers
Olympic Nordic combined skiers of Austria
Nordic combined skiers at the 1988 Winter Olympics
Nordic combined skiers at the 1992 Winter Olympics
Olympic bronze medalists for Austria
Olympic medalists in Nordic combined
FIS Nordic World Ski Championships medalists in Nordic combined
Medalists at the 1992 Winter Olympics
People from Murau
Sportspeople from Styria